Emin Shakhin ogly Safikhanov (born 19 December 1999) is an Azerbaijani-born Ukrainian professional footballer who plays as a left-back for Landesliga Niederrhein club DV Solingen.

References

External links
 
 

1999 births
Living people
People from Sumgait
Ukrainian footballers
Ukrainian expatriate footballers
Association football defenders
FC Zorya Luhansk players
FC Olimpik Donetsk players
FC Arsenal Kyiv players
SC Chaika Petropavlivska Borshchahivka players
FC Hirnyk-Sport Horishni Plavni players
FC Podillya Khmelnytskyi players
Ukrainian First League players
Ukrainian Second League players
IV liga players
Landesliga players
Ukrainian people of Azerbaijani descent
Expatriate footballers in Poland
Expatriate footballers in Germany
Ukrainian expatriate sportspeople in Poland
Ukrainian expatriate sportspeople in Germany